Adlam may refer to:
 Adlam alphabet, a writing system for the Fula languages
 Adlam (Unicode block)
 Adlam (name), an English surname